Only You (非你不可) is a Chinese television series. The storyline centers around an inevitable love triangle that unraveled during a Beijing summer. It stars Taiwanese actress Ruby Lin and Mainland actor Chen Kun.

Main Characters Summary
 Ruby Lin as Si Jia Yi – Sunny girl who sells dolls as a living and has a big crush on Ke Lei.
 Chen Kun as Ke Lei – Is Si Jia Yi’s high school friend and loves music.
 Yang Xue as Su Yan – works in the hospital and is Ke Lei’s girlfriend.
 Jin Li Li as Ke Qin – Ke Lei’s mother

External links
  Ruby Station
  Sina Official Site
  TTV official site

2002 Chinese television series debuts
Chinese romance television series
Mandarin-language television shows